William Cusack may refer to:

Sir William Cusack-Smith, 2nd Baronet (1766–1836), Irish baronet, politician, and judge
Billy Cusack (born 1966), Scottish Olympic judoka

See also 
 Cusack-Smith baronets